The 1966–67 Detroit Red Wings season saw the Red Wings finish in fifth place in the National Hockey League (NHL) with a record of 27 wins, 39 losses, and 4 ties for 58 points. This season would mark the beginning of a downfall for the once mighty Red Wings, over the next twenty seasons between 1967 and 1986, the Red Wings would make the playoffs only four times (1970, 1978, 1984, 1985) winning only one playoff series (1978).

Offseason

Regular season

Final standings

Record vs. opponents

Schedule and results

Playoffs
They didn't qualify

Player statistics

Regular season
Scoring

Goaltending

Note: GP = Games played; G = Goals; A = Assists; Pts = Points; +/- = Plus-minus PIM = Penalty minutes; PPG = Power-play goals; SHG = Short-handed goals; GWG = Game-winning goals;
      MIN = Minutes played; W = Wins; L = Losses; T = Ties; GA = Goals against; GAA = Goals-against average;  SO = Shutouts;

Awards and records

Transactions

Draft picks
Detroit's draft picks at the 1966 NHL Amateur Draft held at the Mount Royal Hotel in Montreal, Quebec.

Farm teams

See also
1966–67 NHL season

References

External links

Detroit
Detroit
Detroit Red Wings seasons
Detroit Red Wings
Detroit Red Wings